Tom Bienemann (January 28, 1928 – October 5, 1999) was a defensive end in the National Football League. He was drafted in the eleventh round of the 1951 NFL Draft by the Chicago Cardinals and played six seasons with the team. Previously, he had been drafted in the 1950 NFL Draft by the Cardinals, but remained in college at Drake University in Des Moines, IA.

References

Players of American football from Wisconsin
Chicago Cardinals players
American football defensive ends
Drake Bulldogs football players
1928 births
1999 deaths
Sportspeople from the Chicago metropolitan area
Sportspeople from Kenosha, Wisconsin